Lego Disney (formerly known as Lego Disney Princess which was launched in 2014 until 2016) is a Lego theme based on the various Disney Princesses and Disney characters involved in different Disney films. It is licensed from Walt Disney Pictures. The theme was first introduced in 2016 and was re-branded theme from the Lego Disney Princess line in 2017.

Overview
The product line focuses on the Disney Princesses and characters who have appeared in various Disney franchises.

In 2019, The Lego Group built three life-sized models of Olaf, Anna and Elsa, three characters that appear in the Disney's Frozen II franchise. The Olaf model consisted of 7,714 Lego bricks and measured 3.4-feet-tall. Anna model consisted of 18,879 Lego bricks and measured 5.6-feet-tall. Elsa model consisted of 22,100 Lego bricks and measured 5.7-feet-tall. They were placed in Los Angeles.

In 2021, The Lego Group built Lego Disney resort hotel model and displayed at Walt Disney World. To celebrate its first anniversary, Disney’s Riviera Resort was recreated in a near-minifigure scale towards the end of last year.

On 8 March 2022, Angus MacLane, the director for the upcoming Lightyear Disney Pixar film had upgraded Zyclops Chase (set number: 76830).

On 4 March 2023, The Lego Group to celebrate 100 Years of Disney in 2023.

Characters

Cinderella

 Cinderella: In the wake of her father's untimely demise, Cinderella is left in the care of her cruel stepmother and jealous stepsisters, who constantly mistreat her, forcing Cinderella to work as a scullery maid in her own home. When Prince Charming holds a ball, the evil stepmother does not allow her to go. Cinderella, aided by her kind Fairy Godmother and equipped with a beautiful silver gown and a unique pair of glass slippers, attends, only to have to leave at midnight when the Fairy Godmother's spell is broken.
 Fairy Godmother: She appears in the garden, and greatly transforms her appearance for the ball. She transforms the mice into stallions, Bruno the dog into a footman, Major the horse into a coachman, a pumpkin into a white coach, and transforms her torn dress into a beautiful silvery-blue dress with comfortable glass slippers. Cinderella departs for the ball after the Fairy Godmother warns her that the spell will expire at the stroke of midnight. With her work done, she vanishes into thin air.
 Prince Charming: Cinderella's love interest. He is a dark-haired, tall, and handsome young man. In the first film, he has no given name. Cinderella's prince is never actually identified in the film as "Prince Charming", nor is there any clear reason why he has come to be known by that title in the Disney vernacular.
 Major: A horse that lives with Cinderella (in the first film) and friend of the mice. He is transformed into a coachman by the Fairy Godmother so that Cinderella can attend the ball in the first film.
 Lucifer: The Tremaines' pet cat and the third antagonist of the franchise. Tonally, his existence can be justified to provide a sinister and scheming opposing counterpart to Cinderella's loyal and good-natured pet dog Bruno as well as the birds and mice who are supportive and loving friends and allies of Cinderella.

Sleeping Beauty

 Aurora: She is the only child of King Stefan and Queen Leah. An evil fairy named Maleficent seeks revenge for not being invited to Aurora's christening and curses the newborn princess, foretelling that she will die before the sun sets on her sixteenth birthday by pricking her finger on a spinning wheel's spindle. Merryweather, however, was able to weaken the curse so Aurora would fall into a deep sleep instead of dying. Determined to prevent this, three good fairies raise Aurora as a peasant in order to protect her, patiently awaiting her sixteenth birthday — the day the spell can only be broken by a kiss from her true love, Prince Phillip.
 Maleficent: She is represented as an evil fairy and the self-proclaimed "Mistress of All Evil" who, after not being invited to a christening, curses the infant Princess Aurora to "prick her finger on the spindle of a spinning wheel and die" before the sun sets on Aurora's sixteenth birthday, also transform Children into Wooden Marionettes by stripping off their energy.
 Merryweather : Princess Aurora's fairy godmothers and guardians, who appear at baby Aurora's christening to present their gifts to her.

The Little Mermaid

 Princess Ariel: The 16-year-old mermaid princess of Atlantica who is fascinated with humans, especially Prince Eric.
 Prince Eric: A human prince saved by Ariel and is determined to find and marry her.
 Ursula: a sea witch who stole Ariel's voice and is determined to ruin her attempts to get Eric to love her.
 Max: An Old English Sheepdog and Eric's pet. Unlike all the other animals in the film, Max is minimally anthropomorphic and does not speak in the human language.
 Sebastian: A red Trinidadian crab and a servant of king Triton, and also his main musical composer.
 Flounder: a yellow and blue tropical fish (despite the name, he is not a flounder) and Ariel's best friend.

Beauty and the Beast

 Belle: A bibliophilic young woman who seeks adventure, and offers her own freedom to the Beast in return for her father's. In their effort to enhance the character from the original story, the filmmakers felt that Belle should be "unaware" of her own beauty and made her "a little odd".
 Beast: A young prince who is transformed into a talking beast by an enchantress as punishment for his arrogance. The animators drew him with the head structure and horns of an American bison, the arms and body of a bear, the ears of a deer, the eyebrows of a gorilla, the jaws, teeth, and mane of a lion, the tusks of a wild boar, and the legs and tail of a wolf.
 Cogsworth: Majordomo, the head of the household staff and Lumière's best friend, who has been transformed into a pendulum clock. He is extremely loyal to the Beast so as to save himself and anyone else any trouble, often leading to friction between himself and Lumière.
 Lumière: The kind-hearted but rebellious French-accented maître d’ of the Beast's castle, who has been transformed into a candelabra. He has a habit of disobeying his master's strict rules, sometimes causing tension between them, but the Beast often turns to him for advice. He is depicted as flirtatious, as he is frequently seen with the Featherduster and immediately takes a liking to Belle. A running gag throughout the movie is Lumière burning Cogsworth.
 Mrs. Potts: The castle cook, turned into a teapot, who takes a motherly attitude toward Belle. The filmmakers went through several names for Mrs. Potts, such as "Mrs. Chamomile", before Ashman suggested the use of simple and concise names for the household objects.

Aladdin

 Aladdin: A poverty-stricken but well-meaning Agrabah thief.
 Jasmine: The princess of Agrabah, who is bored of life in the royal palace.
 Rajah: Princess Jasmine's pet tiger who displays dog and cat-like behavior.

Mulan

 Fa Mulan: A young female who is willing to give up her life to save her father. She enters the army as a man named Ping. She faces the worst enemy China's ever seen, the Hun leader Shan-Yu, who has an army willing to destroy anything in their path. She succeeds in fighting them and saves all of China single-handedly without any help whatsoever. The Emperor of China awards her for her effort and the whole of China celebrate her return.
 Khan: Mulan's horse with a black coat and white markings on his face, belly and legs.

The Princess and the Frog
 Tiana: An African-American 19-year-old waitress and aspiring chef/restaurateur. She is a smart, hard-working, and independent young woman, but one who works so hard that she often forgets important things such as love, fun, and family.

Tangled

 Rapunzel : Born with long hair as the result of the power of the sun drop, was kidnapped by Mother Gothel so she could use the power of Rapunzel's hair. Rapunzel eventually escapes with Flynn Rider and goes on an adventure that changes her life. Always optimistic and searching for the brighter side of things, Rapunzel does all she can to help her friends and family by showing that nothing can keep her down.
 Flynn Rider: Born Horace and better known as Flynn Rider, was abandoned by his father in order to protect him. Flynn grew up as a cocky thief. His luck changed when he found himself unwillingly rescuing Rapunzel from a tall tower. Since then, he has fallen in love with her and has changed his ways to be by her side by protecting her at all costs until he eventually weds her.
 Pascal: A chameleon who was washed away one rainy night until he found himself adopted by a young Rapunzel. Considered Rapunzel's best animal friend, Pascal is ever loyal to her and despite his small appearance, hides boundless energy that always comes in handy when protecting his friends.

Brave
 Merida: A 16-year-old girl who has been forced to be betrothed to strengthen the bond of a kingdom.

Frozen
 Anna: The 18-year-old Princess of Arendelle and Elsa's younger sister.
 Elsa: The 21-year-old Queen of Arendelle who possesses magical ice powers and Anna's elder sister.
 Olaf: A sentient comic-relief snowman that Elsa and Anna created as children, who dreams of experiencing summer.
 Kristoff: An iceman who is accompanied by a reindeer named Sven.
 Mattias: The leader of a group of Arendelle soldiers who were trapped in the enchanted forest for over thirty years.

Moana
 Moana: The curious daughter of village chief Tui and his wife Sina, who is chosen by the ocean to restore the heart of Te Fiti.
 Maui: A legendary strong-willed yet easily annoyed shapeshifting demigod who sets off with Moana on her journey.

Raya and the Last Dragon
 Raya: The fierce and courageous warrior princess of Kumandra's Heart Land who has been training to become a Guardian of the Dragon Gem. To restore peace to Kumandra, she embarks in search for the last dragon.
 Sisu: A goofy young water dragon who is the last of her kind in existence.
 Boun: A charismatic 10-year-old entrepreneur and owner of the "Shrimporium", a boat restaurant in the Tail Land.
 Namaari: The warrior princess of the Fang Land and Raya's enemy.
 Tuk Tuk: Raya's best friend and trusty steed that is a mix of an armadillo and a pill bug.

Encanto
 Mirabel Madrigal: The protagonist, who, unlike her family, does not have a special Gift. Director Jared Bush described her as "imperfect and weird and quirky, but also deeply emotional and incredibly empathetic".
 Abuela Alma Madrigal: Mirabel's grandmother and the family matriarch.
 Antonio Madrigal: Pepa and Félix's youngest son, Dolores and Camilo's brother, and Mirabel's cousin, who looks up to her and considers her a big sister. He can speak to and understand animals.
 Luisa Madrigal: Mirabel's second oldest sister. 
 Isabela Madrigal: Mirabel's oldest sister. She can make flowers bloom everywhere, but secretly struggles to keep up her glamorous disposition.

Lightyear
 Buzz Lightyear: A young test pilot and Space Ranger.
 Emperor Zurg: The commander of the invading robotic army and an evil old version of Buzz from an alternate future.
 Izzy Hawthorne: Alisha's granddaughter, whom Buzz meets.
 Sox: A robotic cat and Buzz's companion.
 Mo Morrison: A fresh and naïve recruit in the colonial defense forces.
 Darby Steel: An elderly paroled convict who has been conscripted into the colonial defense forces.

Toy line
According to Bricklink, The Lego Group released a total of 128 Lego sets based on Lego Disney.

Construction sets

Lego Disney Princess sets
In 2014, The Lego Group partnered with Disney. The first sets were released on 2 January 2014 based on several Disney films, with six sets being released. The six sets were Ariel’s Secret Treasures (set number: 41050), Merida’s Highland Games (set number: 41051) Ariel’s Magical Kiss (set number: 41052), Cinderella’s Enchanted Carriage (set number: 41053), Rapunzel’s Tower of Creativity (set number: 41054) and Cinderella's Romantic Castle (set number: 41055). In addition, the first polybag Rapunzel's Market Visit (set number: 30116) was released as a promotion. Each of the Disney Princess minidoll figures, which are about the same size as a traditional minifigure, but are more detailed and realistic, like the minidolls in the Lego Friends theme. The sets were designed primarily for girls aged 5 to 12.
 
In 2015, the four sets was released on 1 January 2015. The four sets were Aurora’s Bedroom (set number: 41060), Jasmine’s Exotic Adventure (set number: 41061), Elsa’s Sparkling Ice Palace (set number: 41062) and Ariel's Undersea Palace (set number: 41063). Elsa’s Sparkling Ice Castle (set number: 41062) was released in December 2015. Also included, the two sets were Anna & Kristoff’s Sleigh Adventure (set number: 41066) and Arendelle Castle Celebration (set number: 41068). A polybag named Olaf's Summertime Fun (set number: 30397) was released as a promotion.

In 2016, the two sets was released in March 2016. The two sets were Rapunzel’s Best Day Ever (set number: 41065) and Belle’s Enchanted Castle (set number: 41067).

Lego Disney Parks sets
In 2016, the Disney Castle (set number: 71040) was released on 6 October 2016.

In 2019, six sets were released, including Disney Train and Station (set number: 71044) released on 7 September 2019. 

In 2021, Mini Disney Castle (set number: 40478) was released on 1 October 2021. The set consists of 567 pieces with an exclusive Mickey Mouse minifigure.

In 2022, Mini Disney The Haunted Mansion (set number: 40521) was released on 1 August 2022. The set consists of 680 pieces with an exclusive Butler minifigure.

Lego Disney sets
In 2017, six sets were released, which included a polybag named Cinderella's Kitchen (set number: 30551) was released as a promotion. Later, another two sets were released in November 2017 and based on the Moana film.

In 2018, nine sets were released. A polybag named Ariel's Underwater Symphony (set number: 30552) was released as a promotion.

In 2019, six sets were released in October 2019 and based on the Frozen II film. A total of six new sets named Enchanted Tree House (set number: 41164), Anna’s Canoe Expedition (set number: 41165), Elsa and the Reindeer Carriage (set number: 41166), Arendelle Castle (set number: 41167), Elsa’s Jewellery Box (set number: 41168) and Olaf (set number: 41169) which also included Elsa's Winter Throne (set number: 30553) and Olaf's Traveling Sleigh (set number: 40361) released as an additional promotional polybag sets. These included three key chains with attached minidoll figures of Anna, Elsa and Olaf.

In 2020, Mickey Mouse and Minnie Mouse (set number: 43179) was released on 3 July 2020. The set consists of 1739 pieces. Lego Model Designer Ollie Gregory revealed how he designed Mickey Mouse and Minnie Mouse Buildable Characters (set number: 43179) and explained, "When designing a set like this, it’s always important to look at reference," and continued, "In this case we looked at a lot of the original Mickey and Minnie shorts back from the 20s and 30s as well as some of the original character sheets from the Disney archive. From that we can take a look at our existing elements, see what we have that kind of matches the shapes that they have."

In June 2021, The Ice Castle (set number: 43197) was released in July 2021. The set consists of 1709 pieces with 9 mini-doll figures. The set included Lego mini-doll figures of Anna, Kristoff, two versions of Elsa, Olaf and four Snowgie figures.

In February 2022, Ariel’s Underwater Palace (set number: 43207) and Elsa and the Nokk’s Ice Stable (set number: 43209) were released on 1 March 2022.

In May 2022, Anna and Olaf’s Castle Fun (set number: 43204) and Cinderella’s Castle (set number: 43206) were released in June 2022.

In June 2022, Ultimate Adventure Castle (set number: 43205) was released in August 2022. The set consists of 698 pieces with 5 mini-doll figures. The set included Lego mini-doll figures of Snow White, Ariel, Moana, Tiana and Rapunzel.

In December 2022, four sets were released on 1 January 2023. They are Moana’s Catamaran (set number: 43210), Aurora’s Castle (set number: 43211), Rapunzel’s Music Box (set number: 43214) and Princesses on a Magical Journey (set number: 43216). In addition, Disney Princess Creative Castles (set number: 43219) will be released in March 2023.

Lego Raya and the Last Dragon sets
In 2021, the 3 sets based on the Raya and the Last Dragon film was released on 1 March 2021. The 3 sets were Raya and the Heart Palace (set number: 43181), Raya and Sisu Dragon (set number: 43184) and Boun’s Boat (set number: 43185). In addition, Raya and the Ongi (set number: 30558) polybag set was released as a promotion.

Lego Encanto sets
In November 2021, The Madrigal House (set number: 43202) based on the Encanto film was released on 1 December 2021. The set consists of 587 pieces with 3 mini-doll figures. The sets included Lego mini-doll figures of Antonio Madrigal, Mirabel Madrigal and Abuela Alma Madrigal.

Lego Storybook Adventures sets
In 2020, 3 sets was released in January 2020. The 3 sets were Mulan Storybook Adventures (set number: 43174), Little Mermaid Storybook Adventures (set number: 43176) and Beauty and the Beast Storybook Adventures (set number: 43177).

In 2021, Anna and Elsa’s Storybook Adventures (set number: 43175) was released in January 2021.

In November 2021, Antonio's Magical Door (set number: 43200) and Isabela’s Magical Door (set number: 43201) based on the Encanto film was released on 1 December 2021.

In February 2023, Peter Pan & Wendy’s Storybook Adventure (set number: 43220) will be released on 1 April 2023 and based Peter Pan & Wendy film. The set consists of 11 pieces with three micro-dolls. The three micro-dolls are Captain Hook, Peter Pan and Wendy.

Lego Disney Mickey and Friends sets
In May 2021, Lego Disney Mickey and Friends sub-theme was released in June 2021. The five sets were Mickey Mouse’s Propeller Plane (set number: 10772), Minnie Mouse’s Ice Cream Shop (set number: 10773), Mickey Mouse & Minnie Mouse’s Space Rocket (set number: 10774), Mickey Mouse & Donald Duck’s Farm (set number: 10775) and Mickey & Friends Fire Truck & Station (set number: 10776). These sets were specifically designed to be simpler to build with fewer pieces and slightly larger building elements. Each of the sets included Lego minifigures of Mickey Mouse, Minnie Mouse, Goofy, Pluto, Donald Duck and Daisy Duck. James Stephenson, Senior Designer at the Lego Group stated, "I loved Disney Mickey Mouse, Disney Minnie Mouse and all of their friends when I was younger so designing these sets felt very nostalgic. We hope the new LEGO® Disney Mickey and Friends range will offer great fun and role-playing opportunities to help young children learn about friendship, communication and resilience with characters they know and love. With these five new sets that explore firefighting, flying, trips to a farm, space exploration and shopkeeping, we aim to inspire young children and introduce them to LEGO building whatever their interests."

In May 2022, Mickey and Minnie’s Camping Trip (set number: 10777), Mickey, Minnie and Goofy’s Fairground Fun (set number: 10778) and Mickey and Friends Castle Defenders (set number: 10780) are due to be released in summer 2022.

Lego Lightyear sets
In March 2022, the 3 sets based on the Lightyear film will be released on 24 April 2022. The three sets were Zyclops Chase (set number: 76830), Zurg Battle (set number: 76831) and XL-15 Spaceship (set number: 76832) as well as Buzz Lightyear’s Planetary Mission (set number: 10962) under the Duplo theme. Each of the sets included Lego minifigures of Buzz Lightyear, Izzy Hawthorne, Darby Steel, Mo Morrison and Sox the cat.

Lego 100 Years of Wonder sets
In February 2023, The Lego Group announced two sets were released on 1 April 2023. They are Disney Celebration Train (set number: 43212) and ‘Up’ House (set number: 43217). Disney Celebration Train (set number: 43212) consists of 200 pieces with 6 minifigures of Mickey Mouse, Peter Pan, Tinkerbell, Woody, Moana and Minnie Mouse. ‘Up’ House (set number: 43217) consists of 598 pieces with 3 minifigures of Russell, Carl Fredricksen and Dug and based on Up film.

Lego Ideas sets
In 2015, WALL-E (set number: 21303) was released on 1 September 2015 as a part Lego Ideas theme and based on the Pixar film WALL-E, a film that MacLane worked on as the directing animator.

In 2018, Tron Legacy Light Cycle (set number: 21314) was released on 31 March 2018 and based on the vehicle that appears in the film Tron: Legacy.

In 2019, Steamboat Willie (set number: 21317) was released on 1 April 2019 and based on the Walt Disney Studios short film Steamboat Willie.

In 2021, Winnie the Pooh (set number: 21326) was released on 1 April 2021 and based on the Winnie the Pooh franchise.

Lego Art sets
Disney's Mickey Mouse (set number: 31202) was released on 2 January 2021 as a part of the Lego Art theme.

Lego BrickHeadz sets
In 2017, Belle (set number: 41595) and Beast (set number: 41596) were released on 1 March 2017 as a part of Lego BrickHeadz theme and based on the Beauty and the Beast film. Later, Captain Jack Sparrow (set number: 41593) and Captain Armando Salazar (set number: 41594) were released on 2 April 2017 and based on the Pirates of the Caribbean: Dead Men Tell No Tales film.

In 2018, Mr. Incredible & Frozone (set number: 41613) was released in April 2018 and based on Incredibles 2 film. The set consists of 160 pieces and 2 baseplates. Elsa (set number: 41617) and Anna & Olaf (set number: 41618) were released in July 2018 and based on the Frozen film. Ariel & Ursula (set number: 41623) was released in July 2018 and based on The Little Mermaid film. The set consists of 361 pieces and 2 baseplates. Jack Skellington & Sally (set number: 41630) was released in October 2018 and based on The Nightmare Before Christmas film. The set consists of 193 pieces and 2 baseplates.

In 2020, Donald Duck (set number: 40377) and Goofy & Pluto (set number: 40378) were released in February 2020 and based on the Disney cartoon characters. Later, Mickey Mouse (set number: 41624) and Minnie Mouse (set number: 41625) were released in August 2020 and based on the Disney cartoon characters. 

In 2021, Daisy Duck (set number: 40476) and Scrooge McDuck, Huey, Dewey & Louie (set number: 40477) were released in June 2021 and based on the Disney cartoon characters. In December 2021, The Lego Group had revealed the two new sets are Buzz Lightyear (set number: 40552) and Woody & Bo Peep (set number: 40553) were released in February 2022 and based on the Toy Story film. Buzz Lightyear (set number: 40552) consists of 114 pieces with a baseplate and Woody & Bo Peep (set number: 40553) consists of 296 pieces with 2 baseplates.

In January 2022, Chip & Dale (set number: 40550) was released on 1 March 2022 and based on Chip 'n Dale: Rescue Rangers TV series. The set consists of 226 pieces with 2 baseplates.

In January 2023, Disney 100th Celebration (set number: 40622) will be on 1 February 2023 and based on Oswald the Lucky Rabbit, Mickey Mouse (as seen in Steamboat Willie), Snow White and Tinker Bell Disney cartoon characters. The set consists of 501 pieces with 4 baseplates. In addition, EVE & WALL•E (set number: 40619), Cruella & Maleficent (set number: 40620) and Moana & Merida (set number: 40621) were be released on 1 March 2023.

Lego Brick Sketches sets
Mickey Mouse (set number: 40456) and Minnie Mouse (set number: 40457) was released on 1 March 2021 as a sub-brand of the Lego Brick Sketches theme.

Lego DOTS sets
Mickey & Friends Bracelets Mega Pack (set number: 41947), Mickey Mouse & Minnie Mouse Stitch-on Patch (set number: 41963) and Mickey Mouse & Minnie Mouse Back-to-School Project Box (set number: 41964) were released on 1 August 2022 as a sub-brand of the Lego DOTS theme.

Duplo sets
Duplo Disney Princess themed sets have also been produced as part of the Duplo theme and was released in January 2015. These sets are twice the length, height, and width of traditional Lego bricks, making them easier to handle and less likely to be swallowed by younger children. Despite their size, they are still compatible with traditional Lego bricks. The Duplo Disney Princess sets are aimed at children aged two to five, such as Disney Princess Collection (set number: 10596).

In March 2023, 3in1 Magical Castle (set number: 10998) will be released on 1 April 2023.

Collectible minifigures

The Lego Disney Series 1 (set number: 71012) was released 1 May 2016 as a part of Lego Minifigures theme, and includes characters from various Disney films, shows, and musicals. It consists of 18 figures instead of the usual 16.

The Lego Disney Series 2 (set number: 71024) was released on 1 May 2019 as a part of Lego Minifigures theme, and includes characters from various Disney films, shows, and musicals. It consists of 18 figures instead of the usual 16.

The Lego Disney 100 Minifigure Series will be released on 1 May 2023 as a part of Lego Minifigures theme, and includes characters from various Disney films, shows, and musicals. It consists of 18 figures instead of the usual 16.

Web shorts

Lego Disney Princess
The product line was accompanied by a series of animated short films that was released on YouTube.

Lego Encanto
 The Magical World of Disney's Encanto (2021) - An official web short was released on YouTube on 13 December 2021, inspired by both the Encanto animated film as well as the Lego toyline.

TV special

Frozen Northern Lights (2016)

In June 2016, Disney announced a franchise extension called Frozen Northern Lights. This brand extension including animated shorts, book series and a TV special, plus potential characterized toys courtesy of LEGO Friends.

The extension's book series launched the extension on 5 July 2016 with its first book, Journey to the Lights, published by Random House by author Suzanne Francis and is 224 pages in length. The ten books in the series will be released by the end of 2017. The film's main characters attempt to restore the Northern Lights' glimmer and face Little Rock, the series' new protagonist.

A spin-off collection of four shorts developed by LEGO aired on Disney Channel, titled:
Race to Lookout Mountain (a.k.a. Race to Lookout Point)
Out of the Storm
The Great Glacier
Restoring the Northern Lights

They later aired as a whole on 9 December 2016. Titled LEGO Frozen Northern Lights (also known as Frozen: Magic of the Northern Lights in the UK and Lego Frozen Northern Nights elsewhere), the shorts were compiled as a special and featured the returning voice talents of Kristen Bell, Idina Menzel, Jonathan Groff, and Josh Gad. The special received 2.01 million viewers and ranked fifth for the night on cable.

Publications 
A quarterly Lego Disney Princess magazine published by Blue Ocean Entertainment was launched from 2020 to accompany the toy line.

Reception 
In 2015, the Toy Retailers Association listed the Elsa’s Sparkling Ice Castle (set number: 41062) on its official list of Dream Toys 2015. In 2017, the Toy Retailers Association listed the Disney Castle (set number: 71040) on its official list of Toy of the Year Awards. In 2020, The Lego Group reported that the Lego Technic, Lego Star Wars, Lego Classic, Lego Disney Princess, Lego Harry Potter and Lego Speed Champions, "The strong results are due to our incredible team," and that these themes had helped to push revenue for the first half of 2020 grow 7% to DKK 15.7 billion compared with the same period in 2019.

In 2021, Arendelle Castle Village (set number: 41167) was listed as one of the "10 best Lego sets 2021" by official website Pocket-lint.

Awards and nominations
In 2014, Cinderella's Romantic Castle was awarded "DreamToys" in the Build The World category by the Toy Retailers Association.

In 2015, Elsa's Sparkling Ice Castle was awarded "DreamToys" in the Build It And They Will Thrive category by the Toy Retailers Association.

In 2017, Disney Castle (set number: 71040) was awarded "Toy of the Year" and also "Specialty Toy of the Year" by the Toy Association.

In 2022, Ariel, Belle, Cinderella and Tiana’s Storybook Adventures (set number: 43193) was awarded "Toy of the Year" and also "Preschool Toy of the Year" by the Toy Association.

See also
 Lego Avatar
 Lego Toy Story
 Lego Cars
 Lego Prince of Persia
 Lego Pirates of the Caribbean
 Lego The Lone Ranger
 Lego Minifigures (theme)
 Lego Friends
 Lego Elves
 Lego DC Super Hero Girls
 Lego Ideas
 Lego BrickHeadz
 Lego DOTS

References

Bibliography 
 Lego Disney Princess: The Surprise Storm: Chapter Book 1. Authored by Jessica Brody. Published by Disney Book Publishing Inc., 2018. 
 Lego Disney Princess: A Dragon In The Castle?: Chapter Book 2. Authored by Jessica Brody. Published by Disney Book Publishing Inc., 2018. 
 LEGO Disney Princess Ultimate Sticker Collection. Authored by Rosie Peet. Published by Dorling Kindersley, 2018. 
 Disney Princess: Build Your Own Adventure. Authored by Beth Davies, Julia March and Tim Johnson. Published by Dorling Kindersley, 2018. 
 World Of Reading Lego Disney Princess: Lost & Found (level 1). Published by Disney Book Publishing Inc., 2018. 
 World Of Reading Lego Disney Princess: The Friendship Bridge (level 2). Published by Disney Book Publishing Inc., 2018. 
 Lego Disney Princess: The Secret Room. Authored by Jessica Brody. Published by Disney Press, 2019. 
 Lego Disney Princess: The Best Tree House Ever. Published by Disney Press, 2019. 
 Lego Disney Princess: Official Annual 2020. Published by Bonnier Books Ltd, 2019. 
 Meet the Princesses (Lego Disney Princess: Activity Book with Minibuild). Authored by Ameet Studio. Published by Scholastic US, 2019. 
 Under the Sea and More! (Lego Disney Princess: Activity Book with Minibuild), Volume 2. Authored by Ameet Studio. Published by Scholastic Inc., 2019. 
 LEGO Disney Princess My Enchanted Sticker Book. Published by Dorling Kindersley, 2020. 
 Lego Disney Princess Enchanted Treasury. Authored by Julia March. Published by Dorling Kindersley, 2020. 
 LEGO Disney Princess: The Friendship Bridge. Published by Hardie Grant Egmont, 2020. 
 A Magical Sticker Adventure (Lego Disney Princess: Sticker Activity Book). Authored by Ameet Studio. Published by Scholastic Inc., 2020. 
 Magical Adventures (Lego Disney Princess: Activity Book with Minibuild). Authored by Ameet Studio. Published by Scholastic Inc., 2020. 
 LEGO Disney Princess Meet Belle. Authored by Julia March. Published by Dorling Kindersley, 2021. 
 LEGO Disney Princess Meet Moana. Authored by Tori Kosara. Published by Dorling Kindersley, 2021. 
 LEGO (TM) Disney Princess The Surprise Storm. Authored by Lego. Published by Hardie Grant Egmont, 2021.

External links
 

Disney Princess
Disney Princess
Lego themes licensed from Disney
Products introduced in 2016